Stephen Michael Kindon (born 17 December 1950) is a former professional footballer who played mainly on the left wing but also at centre forward. He was noted for his pace, and won "the Fastest Footballer in Britain award" seven times.

Kindon was born in Warrington and began his career at Burnley where he played over 100 games and scored 28 goals. "The Tank" moved to Wolverhampton Wanderers in 1972, where his bustling style made him a crowd favourite. He scored 31 goals in over 150 league and cup appearances for Wolves.

In 1977, he returned to Burnley before moving to Huddersfield Town where he was part of a minor piece of football history, being one of three goalkeepers used in an FA Cup Tie v Shrewsbury Town in 1981. Regular goalkeeper Andy Rankin was injured and Kindon took his place, only to be injured himself, his place in turn being taken by Mark Lillis. Each of them conceded a goal, and this remains an English record for the number of keepers used in one game. Injury then ended his career in 1982. Kindon was an England Youth, Under-23 and "B" international. He is now an after-dinner speaker.

References

Living people
English footballers
England B international footballers
English Football League players
Association football wingers
Association football forwards
Footballers from Warrington
1950 births
Burnley F.C. players
Wolverhampton Wanderers F.C. players
Huddersfield Town A.F.C. players